Right-bank Ukraine (Pravoberezhna Ukrayina; , Pravoberezhnaya Ukraina; ,) is a historical and territorial name for a part of modern Ukraine on the right (west) bank of the Dnieper River, corresponding to the modern-day oblasts of Vinnytsia, Zhytomyr, Kirovohrad, as well as the western parts of Kyiv and Cherkasy. It was separated from the left bank during the Ruin.

Right-bank Ukraine is bordered by the historical regions of Volhynia and Podolia to the west, Moldavia to the southwest, Yedisan and Zaporizhzhia to the south, left-bank Ukraine to the east, and Polesia to the north.

Main cities of the region include Cherkasy, Kropyvnytskyi, Bila Tserkva, Zhytomyr and Oleksandriia.

History
The history of right- and left-bank Ukraine is closely associated with the Khmelnytsky Uprising of 1648–57. The territory was part of the Polish–Lithuanian Commonwealth under the House of Vasa until the Russo-Polish War triggered by Khmelnytsky's Treaty of Pereyaslav, 1654, with the Muscovy alliance. After the 13-year conflict, the victorious Tsardom of Russia incorporated the left-bank Ukraine along with the city of Kiev in 1667 following the Truce of Andrusovo. 

Meanwhile, right-bank Ukraine remained in the Commonwealth until the partitions of Poland in the late 18th century. As part of the Lesser Poland Province of the Polish Crown it was divided into two voivodeships: Kiev and Bracław. In 1669 Hetman Petro Doroshenko allowed right-bank Ukraine to be part of the Ottoman Empire. The southernmost Podolia in the right-bank Ukraine was invaded by Ottomans in 1672. 

Following the 1683 victory of the Christian powers in the Battle of Vienna, in 1699 the Treaty of Karlowitz returned those lands to the Commonwealth. During the 18th century, two Cossack uprisings took place. In 1793 right-bank Ukraine was annexed by the Russian Empire in the Second Partition of Poland, becoming part of the guberniya ('governorate') of Little Russia.

In the 19th century, the population of right-bank Ukraine was mostly Ukrainian, but most of the land was owned by the Polish or Polonized Ukrainian nobility. Many of the towns and cities belonged to the Pale of Settlement and had a substantial Jewish population, while the Polish-speaking nobility was mostly Roman Catholic. Most of the peasantry became Greek Catholic only in the 18th century, and after the Partitions of Poland, largely converted to Orthodoxy long before the disestablishment of the Unia in 1839. The right-bank Ukraine was subsequently divided into four provinces (guberniyas), each with its own administration: Kiev, Volhynia, Kherson and Podolia.

Hetmans (1685–1699)
 1684–1689 Andriy Mohyla
 1689–1692 Hryshko Ivanovych
 1693–1699 Samiylo Samus

References

Geographic history of Ukraine
Historical regions in Ukraine
Early Modern history of Ukraine
Subdivisions of the Russian Empire
Cossack Hetmanate